Soi Dao is a district (amphoe) in the northern part of Chanthaburi province, eastern Thailand.

History
The government created the minor district (king amphoe) Soi Dao on 1 January 1988, by splitting off five tambon from Pong Nam Ron district. It was upgraded to a full district on 9 May 1992.

Geography
Neighboring districts are (from the south clockwise) Pong Nam Ron, Khao Khitchakut, Kaeng Hang Maeo of Chanthaburi Province, Wang Sombun, and Khlong Hat of Sa Kaeo province. To the east is Battambang province of Cambodia.

Administration
The district is divided into five sub-districts (tambons), which are further subdivided into 68 villages (mubans). Sai Khao is a township (thesaban tambon) which covers parts of tambon Sai Khao and Pa Tong. There are a further five tambon administrative organizations (TAO).

References

External links
amphoe.com

Soi Dao